Agneta Ringman, born 1949, is a Swedish social democratic politician. She was a member of the Riksdag from 1994 to 2006.

External links
Agneta Ringman at the Riksdag website

1949 births
Living people
Members of the Riksdag from the Social Democrats
Women members of the Riksdag
Members of the Riksdag 2002–2006
21st-century Swedish women politicians